Stagg House, also known as the Dr. Bradley House, is a historic home located at Burlington, Alamance County, North Carolina. It was built between 1857 and 1859, and is a two-story, "T"-shaped, frame dwelling. Connected to the main block are numerous one-story wings that appear to date to the late-19th century.  It has a large wraparound porch and features a rectangular projecting front bay with tall and narrow windows. It is one of only a few antebellum houses surviving in Burlington.

It was added to the National Register of Historic Places in 1984.

References

Houses on the National Register of Historic Places in North Carolina
Houses completed in 1859
Buildings and structures in Burlington, North Carolina
National Register of Historic Places in Alamance County, North Carolina
Houses in Alamance County, North Carolina
1859 establishments in North Carolina